The 2015 Notre Dame Fighting Irish men's soccer team will represent University of Notre Dame during the 2015 NCAA Division I men's soccer season. It will be the 39th season of the university fielding a program.

2015 squad

Schedule 

|-
!colspan=6 style="background:#002649; color:#CC9933;"| Exhibition
|-

|-

|-

|-
!colspan=6 style="background:#002649; color:#CC9933;"| Regular Season
|-

|-

|-

|-

|-

|-

|-

|-

|-

|-

|-

|-

|-

|-

|-

|-

|-

|-

See also 

 Notre Dame Fighting Irish men's soccer
 2015 Atlantic Coast Conference men's soccer season
 2015 NCAA Division I men's soccer season
 2015 ACC Men's Soccer Tournament
 2015 NCAA Division I Men's Soccer Championship

References

External links 
 2015 Schedule

Notre Dame Fighting Irish
Notre Dame Fighting Irish men's soccer seasons
Notre Dame Fighting Irish, Soccer
Notre Dame Fighting Irish